The Afyon Province of western Turkey was struck by an earthquake measuring 6.5  on 3 February 2002 at 10:11 local time (07:11 UTC). It had a maximum felt intensity of VIII (Severe) on the Modified Mercalli intensity scale. It damaged hundreds of buildings and caused the deaths of 44 people and a further 318 injuries.

Tectonic setting
Most of western Turkey lies in an area of extensional tectonics that extends into the Aegean Sea. The cause of the extension is thought to be the rollback of the subducting slab of the African Plate that dips northwards beneath the Aegean. The overall N–S extension has resulted in a series of NW–SE to W–E trending seismically active normal faults with associated rift basins. The Afyon–Akşehir Graben lies in the hanging-wall of the low-angle Sultandağı Fault and contains nearly 1 km of late Miocene to Quaternary sedimentary fill. Part of this fault ruptured during a magnitude 6.0 earthquake in December 2000.

Earthquake
The earthquake had a magnitude in the range 6.2–6.7 . The observed focal mechanism is consistent with normal faulting along a fault trending WSW–ENE, although the local trend of the basin-bounding fault is closer to WNW–ESE. The distribution of the aftershocks, however, is consistent with a rupture along part of the Sultandağı Fault of about 40 km in length. It also suggests that the rupture propagation was almost unidirectional towards the northwest, with the mainshock close to the southeastern end of the rupture.

A large aftershock, measuring 5.8–6.0 , occurred roughly two hours after the mainshock near the western end of the Sultandağı Fault.

Analysis of the coulomb stress transfer associated with the M6.0 earthquake on 15 December 2000 suggests that these stress changes triggered the 2002 mainshock. The epicentre of the mainshock lies near the termination of the rupture associated with the earlier earthquake, consistent with this interpretation.

Damage
There was significant damage in 8 of the 18 districts in Afyon Province and some damage in Akşehir in Konya Province. A total of 4,051 residential and 339 commercial buildings either collapsed or were badly damaged. A further 10,402 residential and 884 commercial buildings suffered either low or medium levels of damage. The town of Çay suffered the most damage and had the greatest number of fatalities.

The most damaged building type was the traditional Himis style, which consists of timber frames with adobe and rubble infill and heavy roofs. Collapse of this building type was responsible for causing most of the deaths and injuries in this earthquake.

See also
List of earthquakes in 2002
List of earthquakes in Turkey

References

External links
 
 

2002 disasters in Turkey
2002 earthquakes
Earthquakes in Turkey
2002 in Turkey
February 2002 events in Turkey
History of Afyonkarahisar Province